Torgeir Andersen (born 16 February 1916 in Nøtterøy, died 5 February 1991) was a Norwegian politician for the Conservative Party.

He was elected to the Norwegian Parliament from Vestfold in 1969, and was re-elected on one occasion.

On the local level he was a member of Nøtterøy municipality council from 1951 to 1971, serving as mayor from 1959 to 1969. He was county mayor of Vestfold from 1963 to 1971. He chaired the county party chapter from 1972 to 1975.

References

1916 births
1991 deaths
Members of the Storting
Conservative Party (Norway) politicians
Chairmen of County Councils of Norway
Mayors of places in Vestfold
20th-century Norwegian politicians
People from Nøtterøy